Istanbul Technical University Robot Olympics (ITURO) (Turkish: İstanbul Teknik Üniversitesi Robot Olimpiyatları (İTÜRO)) is a robotic organization consisting competitions, seminars, colloquies, panel discussions, exhibitions and workshops that has been hosted by Istanbul Technical University Control and Automation Student Society since 2007. The three-day organization ITURO is organized at ITU Suleyman Demirel Cultural Center in Ayazağa Campus in every spring. In 2015, there were ten categories and the categories are being updated every year. Also, by the participation of experienced academics and industrial representatives, topics related to robotics and technology become discussed in both national and international manner.

Purposes 
 Drawing attention on robotics,
 Supporting interested people through seminars and colloquies with knowledge and experience, facilitating exhibitions for their works,
 Discussing the progress of robotics science and technology,
 Exploring new sights of robotics education,
 Questioning the capabilities of robot projects in industrial point of view and supporting them to become higher-level,
 Helping students to get in contact with academics and industrial representatives,
 Providing and supporting international communication in order to contribute to the development of robotics technology.

Competitions

Line following 

In this category, robots are aimed to maintain the position on the white line on a black track or the black line on a white track, by the help of the sensors they contain. The competition has three stages, which get harder in progress. Each robot compete one-by-one; the robot that complete the track including gates, ramps and bridges in the shortest period wins the competition. Further, in case of getting out-of-track or crashing on the gate, the robot gets a penalty in the scoring. The track is 40 cm in width and the lines on it are 2 cm in width.

Basketball 

In this category, robots must sense the hoops and score baskets.

Micro sumo 

This category consists of one-on-one matches on a ring called dojo. The robots are set to get the opponent robot out of the dojo. The robot that stays on the dojo wins one of the three rounds. After group matches, qualification stage proceeds and after that stage, final group qualifies. Succeeding final group matches, the robot that finishes the matches in the leader position wins the competition. A micro sumo robot should fit in a 5 cm × 5 cm box (in length and width). Dojos are round-shaped and 38.5 cm in width.

Fire fighting 

In this category, robots are aimed to extinguish the candles in a maze-like built platform by the help of their sensors. The robots compete one-by-one and the robot that extinguished most candles in a certain time wins the competition. It is forbidden to use water, foam etc. to extinguish; robots have to blow air on candles. Also in case of knocking candles down or turning on the extinguishing system on an area without fire, the robot gets a penalty in the scoring. The width of the paths on the maze is 40 cm in width and the height of the walls are 20 cm in width.

Stair climbing 

The robots competing in this category aims to climb a stairway with a continuously increasing height of steps. The robots compete one-by-one and the robot that has most stairs climbed up and down in the shortest time wins the competition. The stairs are 40 cm in width and 10 cm, 15 cm and 20 cm in height respectively.

Maze 

The robots in this category are to finish the maze in two stages: Memorizing and application. The robots try to track the correct path by distinguish the right and wrong paths over the maze and aim to get out of it. Each robot compete one-by-one and the robot that managed to get out of the maze in the shortest period of time wins the competition. Crashing on walls and tracking the wrong path in the application stage occurs a penalty in the scoring. The corridors are 20 cm long and 20 cm wide.

Color Selecting 

In this category robots must carry the cubes to correct colored areas.

Self-balancing robot 

The robots of this category have two wheels in parallel and set to maintain their balance on a flat field. To participate the second stage, the robots have to succeed the first round: The time test. Also, robots get extra points in inclined starting position and external force tests in the first stage if they manage to accomplish those. In the second stage, the robots are expected to have motion on a track including a bridge and this motion shapes the scoring. Each robot compete one-by-one and the robot collected the highest score wins the competition.

Scenario: Construction 

In this category, which launched first at ITURO 2015, robots try to construct the structure that is already given before the competition with the blocks which are supplied them as flawless and fast as they can.

Innovative Category 

In this category, the participants exhibit their projects to the Innovative Category jury and the subscribers for all three days. The jury that arranged by the ITURO staff scores the projects in the criterion of mechanical design, usage of technical knowledge, innovation, actuality and performance in presentation and the winner project becomes determined. The most interesting robots of ITURO compete in this category.

Previous ITUROs
 
The seventh ITURO, ITURO 2013 will be organized on April 11-12-13th 2013, at ITU Suleyman Demirel Cultural Center

References

External links 
 ITURO official webpage
 ITURO on Facebook
 ITURO on Twitter
 ITURO on YouTube

Istanbul Technical University